

Hinrich Warrelmann (16 April 1904 – 9 October 1980) was a German general during World War II. He was a recipient of the  Knight's Cross of the Iron Cross with Oak Leaves of Nazi Germany.

Awards and decorations
 Iron Cross (1939) 2nd Class (21 September 1939) & 1st Class (13 June 1940)
 German Cross in Gold on 28 February 1942 as Major in MG-Bataillon 2
 Knight's Cross of the Iron Cross with Oak Leaves
 Knight's Cross on 16 April 1944 as Oberst and commander of Grenadier-Regiment 502
 Oak Leaves on 19 August 1944 as Oberst and commander of Grenadier-Regiment 502

References

 
 
 

1904 births
1980 deaths
People from the Grand Duchy of Oldenburg
Major generals of the German Army (Wehrmacht)
Recipients of the Gold German Cross
Recipients of the Knight's Cross of the Iron Cross with Oak Leaves
German prisoners of war in World War II held by the United Kingdom
Military personnel from Oldenburg (city)
German Army officers of World War II